Christian Michael Kouamé Kouakou (born 6 December 1997) is an Ivorian professional footballer who plays as a forward for Serie A club Fiorentina and the Ivory Coast national team.

Club career
Kouamé started playing football on the streets of Bingerville, a suburb of Abidjan, Ivory Coast. At the age of 16, he moved with other Ivorian teenagers to Italy to participate in trials with several clubs. Eventually he was signed by Prato and as still a minor at that time, grew up with an Italian foster family he is still close with.

Kouamé made his professional debut in the Lega Pro for Prato on 6 September 2015 in a game against Pisa.

On 13 July 2018, Kouamé signed with Serie A side Genoa.

On 31 January 2020, he joined Fiorentina on loan with an obligation to buy.

International career
Kouamé debuted for the Ivory Coast U23s in a pair of 2019 Africa U-23 Cup of Nations qualification matches in March 2019. He was called-up for the final tournament in November 2019, suffering a knee injury.

He made his debut for the Ivory Coast senior national team on 13 October 2019 in a friendly against DR Congo.

Career statistics

Club

Honours
Ivory Coast U23
Africa U-23 Cup of Nations: runner-up 2019

References

External links

 Profile at the ACF Fiorentina website 
 
 
 

1997 births
Footballers from Abidjan
Living people
Ivorian footballers
Association football forwards
Ivory Coast international footballers
Ivory Coast under-20 international footballers
Serie A players
Serie B players
Serie C players
Belgian Pro League players
A.C. Prato players
A.S. Cittadella players
Genoa C.F.C. players
ACF Fiorentina players
R.S.C. Anderlecht players
Footballers at the 2020 Summer Olympics
Olympic footballers of Ivory Coast
2021 Africa Cup of Nations players
Ivorian expatriate footballers
Ivorian expatriate sportspeople in Italy
Expatriate footballers in Italy
Ivorian expatriate sportspeople in Belgium
Expatriate footballers in Belgium